The six Piratini-class patrol boats are a series of patrol vessels that were built for the Brazilian Navy at the Rio de Janeiro Navy Arsenal. Based on the United States Coast Guard  design, they were built between 1970 and 1971 as coastal patrol vessels. In 1993 they were moved from coastal patrol to riverine patrol.

Description

The Piratini class was initially armed with a .50 calibre machine gun mount and an  mortar mount. In 1988, the 81 mm mortar mount was removed. The main armament was later altered to two  machine guns and one  Oerlikon cannon. They were initially designed for coastal patrol. In 1993, the class was designated for riverine patrol.

Ships in class

Service history
The class was constructed as part of the offshore agreement with the United States. All six vessels were completed in 1970–1971. In 2009, Piratini, Penedo and Poti were based at Ladário Fluvial Base in Mato Grosso, the others, in Amazonas.

Citations

References

External links
 PGM-119, NavSource Online

Patrol boat classes
Patrol vessels of the Brazilian Navy